Justin Davies (born 1996) is a Welsh actor best known for playing Ben Morris in the Sky1 TV comedy drama series Stella He also made an appearance in the Miss Peregrine's Home for Peculiar Children.

Filmography

Television

Film

References

External links
 

Living people
Welsh male television actors
People from Abertillery
21st-century Welsh male actors
Welsh male film actors
1996 births